The Martine Vik Magnussen case involves the rape and murder of 23-year-old Norwegian female business student Martine Vik Magnussen. She was found in the basement of an apartment block, hidden under rubble, in a block of flats in Great Portland Street, London, on 16 March 2008. She died from compression to the neck, the cause of strangulation.

Farouk Abdulhak, the son of billionaire and one of Yemen's wealthiest men, Shaher Abdulhak, is the only suspect in the case.

Details of the case

Murder and investigation
Magnussen was last seen alive sometime between 0200 and 0300 GMT on 14 March at the Maddox nightclub in London's wealthy Mayfair district, more than a mile from the basement where her body was found. The club's official website states that since its opening, it has been London's hottest member's club, attracting everyone from P Diddy to Keira Knightley. Friends reported Magnussen missing to police on 15 March. Police appealed for a man of Arab appearance, who Magnussen is believed to have left the club with, to come forward.

In early April 2008, it was still unknown when Magnussen's body was to be returned to Norway from London, UK, but in late April it was known that the body was being returned, and a funeral was to be held in Asker, off Oslo in April/May 2008.

As of March 2016, Detective Chief Inspector Andy Partridge of the Metropolitan Police Service's Homicide & Major Crime Command has said:This case is still very much a live investigation. Farouk Abdulhak remains wanted for the rape and murder of Martine Vik Magnussen. Farouk Abdulhak has known for the past eight years now that he is wanted for the rape and murder of Magnussen. There have been extensive diplomatic efforts made over this time to return him to the UK, to no avail. This anniversary should serve as a further reminder that he cannot put this behind him, it will not go away and I appeal to him and those close to him to advise him to return to the UK to stand trial.

Suspect
Scotland Yard wishes to question the man that Magnussen left the club with on the night she was murdered, Farouk Abdulhak, her fellow student and the son of billionaire and one of Yemen's wealthiest men, Shaher Abdulhak. Farouk Abdulhak and Vik Magnussen were seen leaving the Maddox nightclub in the early hours of 14 March, and getting into a cab together. He lived in the block of flats where she was found. Police have flight records showing that Farouk Abdulhak left London for Cairo on 14 March, and believe he then fled to Yemen. It is believed that the suspect proceeded from Cairo to Sanaa in his father's private plane. On Sunday 23 March it was reported that Farouk had appeared at the offices of lawyer Mohammed al Bakwli in Sana'a, capital of Yemen, seeking legal assistance. Mr. al Bakwli says Farouk can be questioned by British authorities, as long as it happens in Yemen. Farouk was mentioned as a suspect by the British police for the first time on 23 June 2008. On 30 July 2008, he was officially named a suspect by the Metropolitan Police, and listed as wanted on Scotland Yard's "Wanted" site.

Abdulhak is understood by the police (per 30 July 2008) to be living in Yemen. The government in Yemen is aware of the UK's request to question Abdulhak, however the UK does not have an extradition agreement with Yemen. A demonstration in Oslo on 1 December 2009 called for further action from Norwegian authorities.

Arrest
On 30 April 2008, a man in his 50s was arrested, for suspicion of assisting the murderer.

Missing items
A number of items Magnussen wore when she was last seen, were not found when police discovered her body. The Scotland Yard has published photos of similar items. The missing items are: Christian Dior earrings, snakeskin shoes, a Marc Jacobs handbag, a Guess watch, a silver costume diamond ring, and her jeans (described as blue and of a "skinny" fit).

Life of Martine Vik Magnussen
Martine Vik Magnussen was born in Nesøya, in Asker, Norway. Her father worked within sales and marketing in the IT industry and was also running a small family business that produced a ski sledge for transportation of people on snow. This venture is now run by his son.

Magnussen was a former student at Kristelig Gymnasium in Oslo, Norway, a private Christian school. Magnussen has worked for clothing retail stores in Oslo, and for Massimo Dutti. In 2006, she went to Poland to study medicine, but quit the studies after six months. In early 2007, she went to London, where she worked for six months, before she commenced her studies at Regents Business School London in autumn 2007. On the night of her murder, she was celebrating coming top of her class.

On 10 June 2010, her father paid tribute to the Metropolitan Police and the British authorities at a remembrance event hosted by her family at Regent's College and unveiled a tree planted in her memory. Mr Magnussen also revealed that he was still engrossed in a battle to change the laws which he said have allowed the man suspected of his daughter's killing, Farooq Abdulhak, to get away.

Yemeni news coverage
According to the Norwegian TV channel TV2, the local Arab media in Yemen did not mention that the son of one of the country's richest men, Shaher Abdulhak, was wanted for questioning regarding the death of Magnussen. Yemen is one of the poorest countries in the Arab world, and Shaher Abdulhak is the founder and owner of a Yemen-based company that is involved with regional trade and industry; he is the chairman for the hotel Taj Sheba in Sana'a, and is an executive with the Yemen franchise of Coca-Cola. He has big political influence in Sana'a, with close connections to the government.

Arrest of alleged accomplice
On March 8, 2022 police announced the arrest of an unnamed woman on charges of "assisting an offender" in this case. Police asked Farouk Abdulhak to return to Britain to face justice.

References

External links
Images and Videos - Farouk Abdulhak at the Metropolitan Police Service
JusticeForMartine.com, made by friends of Martine Vik Magnussen

March 2008 crimes
2000s murders in London
2008 murders in the United Kingdom
2008 in London
Murder in London
2000s in the City of Westminster
Unsolved murders in London
March 2008 events in Europe
Rape in London
Deaths by strangulation
Violence against women in London